The 1926 New Mexico Lobos football team represented the University of New Mexico as an independent during the 1926 college football season. In their seventh season under head coach Roy W. Johnson, the Lobos compiled a 4–2–1 record.

The season marked the beginning of a 13-game unbeaten streak (11 wins and 2 ties) and a 12-game home winning streak. Those streaks continued until October 13, 1928, and remain the longest in school history.

The team's 63-point loss to Texas A&M on October 16 was the third largest margin of defeat in school history to that date.

Schedule

References

New Mexico
New Mexico Lobos football seasons
New Mexico Lobos football